West Atlantic is a holding company for two European cargo airlines, West Air Sweden and West Atlantic UK, with its head office in Malmö, Sweden. West Atlantic employ some 650 staff and operate a fleet of 22 aircraft. The airline specializes in the transport of mail, dangerous goods and general cargo.

History
Air Transport Services Group, Inc. announced on 9 December 2013 an agreement to acquire a 25 percent equity interest in West Atlantic. This investment meant the Boeing 767-200 being added into West Atlantic's fleet. 

The 767-200 with registration SE-RLA made its first flight on 26 March 2015, and its first commercial flight on the night between 6 and 7 April, with two further 767-200s joining the fleet later in 2015.

On 20 June 2017, West Atlantic announced it will take delivery of four leased Boeing 737-800(BCF) from GE Capital Aviation Services, with the aircraft being delivered between 2017 and 2019.

On 10 April 2019, LUSAT Air S.L. signed an agreement with West Atlantic to become the new majority shareholder in return for a €20 million cash injection.

Fleet 
As of October 2022, the West Atlantic group fleet includes the following aircraft:

Accidents and incidents
 On 8 January 2016, a West Atlantic CRJ200 operating as SWN294 from Oslo to Tromsø crashed close to the Norwegian border, by Lake Akkajaure in the Swedish Lapplandsfjällen. The two pilots, a Captain aged 42 and First Officer aged 34, the only persons on board the aircraft at the time, both died in the accident.
 On 22 May 2020, a West Atlantic BAe ATP-F landing at Birmingham Airport in high winds failed to maintain appropriate aileron control resulting in a runway excursion. The aircraft left the runway for 450m on the landing roll but suffered no damage.
On 19 January 2021, a West Atlantic 737-400 freighter suffered a very hard landing at Exeter Airport, causing many creases in the fuselage. The aircraft was written off and scrapped on-site.

References 

Cargo airlines
Airline holding companies